The Kosrae fruit dove (Ptilinopus hernsheimi), is a species of bird in the family Columbidae found on Kosrae in the Micronesian Islands. It was formerly considered as a subspecies of the crimson-crowned fruit dove. Its natural habitats are subtropical or tropical moist lowland forests and subtropical or tropical mangrove forests.

References

Hayes, F.E., H.D. Pratt, and C.J. Cianchini. 2016. The avifauna of Kosrae, Micronesia: history, status, and taxonomy. Pacific Science 70: 91–127.

Ptilinopus
Birds described in 1880